North Litchfield Township (T9N R5W) is located in Montgomery County, Illinois, United States. As of the 2010 census, its population was 5,148 and it contained 2,315 housing units.

Geography

Demographics

Adjacent townships
 Zanesville Township, Montgomery County (north)
 Raymond Township, Montgomery County (northeast)
 Butler Grove Township (east)
 Hillsboro Township (southeast)
 South Litchfield Township (south)
 Cahokia Township, Macoupin County (southwest)
 Honey Point Township (west)
 Shaws Point Township (northwest)

References

External links
City-data.com
Illinois State Archives
Historical Society of Montgomery County

Townships in Montgomery County, Illinois
1872 establishments in Illinois
Townships in Illinois